Allomerism is the similarity in the crystalline structure of substances of different chemical composition.

References
 Penguin Science Dictionary 1994, Penguin Books

Solid-state chemistry